Zetekitoxin AB (ZTX) is a guanidine alkaloid found in the Panamanian golden frog Atelopus zeteki. It is an extremely potent neurotoxin.

Structure
ZTX is a guanidine alkaloid. It's structurally related to saxitoxin, but with some differences. ZTX has a guanidine core similar to saxitoxin. It contains an isoxazolidine ring, a sulfonate group and a N-hydroxycarbamate group.

Mechanism of action
ZTX is an extremely potent sodium channel blocker. It has been shown to block the voltage-gated sodium channels at picomolar concentrations. It is about 580 times more potent than saxitoxin.

Toxicity
ZTX is an extremely potent neurotoxin. The  of ZTX in mice is 11 μg/kg.

See also
Voltage-gated sodium channel
Saxitoxin
Tetrodotoxin

References

Neurotoxins
Voltage-gated sodium channel blockers
Guanidine alkaloids
Alcohols
Geminal diols
Isoxazolidines
Carbamates
Lactams
Hydroxamic acids
Nitrogen heterocycles
Poison dart frogs
Sulfate esters
Vertebrate toxins
Heterocyclic compounds with 5 rings